Raúl Rodrigo Lara Tovar (born 28 February 1973) is a Mexican former professional footballer who played as a midfielder.

Career
Lara was a member of the Mexico national team at the 1998 FIFA World Cup, playing three games at the tournament. He participated also at 1996 Summer Olympics. Famous for two mistakes that caused Mexico's elimination against Germany in the 1998 FIFA World Cup.

External links

1973 births
Living people
Mexico international footballers
Olympic footballers of Mexico
Footballers at the 1996 Summer Olympics
1997 FIFA Confederations Cup players
1998 FIFA World Cup players
1996 CONCACAF Gold Cup players
1998 CONCACAF Gold Cup players
CONCACAF Gold Cup-winning players
1997 Copa América players
1999 Copa América players
Footballers from Mexico City
Club América footballers
San Luis F.C. players
Club Puebla players
Lobos BUAP footballers
Association football midfielders
Mexican footballers
Footballers at the 1995 Pan American Games
Pan American Games silver medalists for Mexico
Pan American Games medalists in football
Medalists at the 1995 Pan American Games